RDS-3 was the third atomic bomb developed by the Soviet Union in 1951, after the famous RDS-1 and RDS-2. It was called Marya in the military. The bomb had a composite design with a plutonium core inside a uranium shell, providing an explosive power of 41.2 kilotons. The RDS-3T was a modernized version and the first  mass-produced nuclear weapon by the Soviet Union. It was assigned to Long Range Aviation in 1953.

Testing
RDS-3 was tested on October 18, 1951, being air-dropped. It was the first such test of a nuclear device by the Soviets, known as Joe-3 in the West. It was detonated at an altitude of four hundred meters. The resulting flash could be seen from 170 kilometers away, and the sound heard from around the same distance. The footage of the test was filmed by an instrument tower 7.5 kilometers from ground zero.

See also
Soviet atomic bomb project
RDS-1
RDS-2
RDS-4
RDS-37
RDS-220 (Tsar Bomba)

References 

Soviet nuclear weapons testing
Nuclear bombs of the Soviet Union
Cold War aerial bombs of the Soviet Union
1951 in the Soviet Union